Muhammad Hakimi bin Ismail (born 8 April 1991) is a Malaysian male professional triple jumper. 
He was born in Taiping, Perak and started his early education at SMK King Edward VII, Taiping. He was one of the best athletes in his school for year 2008. He competed in the Men's triple jump event at the 2015 World Championships in Athletics and placed 27th in Beijing, China. On 9 June 2015, Hakimi won a gold medal and set a new SEA Games record with a leap of 16.76m.
 
His personal bests in the event are 16.76 metres outdoors (-0.2 m/s, Singapore 2015) and 16.00 metres indoors (Hangzhou 2014). Both are current national records.

Competition record

References

1991 births
Living people
Malaysian male triple jumpers
People from Perak
World Athletics Championships athletes for Malaysia
Athletes (track and field) at the 2014 Asian Games
Athletes (track and field) at the 2018 Asian Games
Athletes (track and field) at the 2018 Commonwealth Games
Southeast Asian Games medalists in athletics
Southeast Asian Games gold medalists for Malaysia
Southeast Asian Games silver medalists for Malaysia
Competitors at the 2013 Southeast Asian Games
Competitors at the 2015 Southeast Asian Games
Competitors at the 2017 Southeast Asian Games
Competitors at the 2019 Southeast Asian Games
Asian Games competitors for Malaysia
University of Putra Malaysia alumni
Commonwealth Games competitors for Malaysia
21st-century Malaysian people